Arvi Kullervo Lind (born December 21, 1940) is a retired Finnish television news presenter. He worked as the news anchor on Yleisradio TV1 from 1965 to 2003. Along with Kari Toivonen, he was one of the longest-serving employees of Yleisradio news.

Lind was born in Lauritsala. His career as a reporter in Yleisradio TV news began on October 15, 1965. His last news broadcast was on Wednesday, October 15, 2003, at 20:30 EEST, and he retired from his work at the beginning of year 2004. The farewell broadcast was seen by over 1.6 million viewers. Since then, he has lectured about his work in universities, and in 2005, the newspaper Keskisuomalainen appointed him as their reader ombudsman. He's often been called "the most trustworthy man in Finland" by the media.

The biography Lindin Arvi was written by Heikki Hietamies.

Lind is also a sports hobbyist, and played ice hockey in a team called Zoom. His son Juha Lind has played in national and NHL level.

In Suuret suomalaiset, Lind ranked 85th.

External links

 Arvi Lind televisiotoimittajana 1965–2003 
 Arvi Lind's last news broadcast 
 Arvi Lind in 375 humanists 31.7.2015. Faculty of Arts, University of Helsinki.

Finnish journalists
1940 births
Living people
Finnish television journalists
People from Lauritsala